The Church of World Messianity (世界救世教 Sekai Kyūsei Kyō in Japanese), abbreviated COWM, is a Japanese new religion founded in 1935 by Mokichi Okada. There are three pillars of the religion, of which the key concept is Johrei, claimed to be a method of channeling divine light into the body of another for the purposes of healing. Other formal practices include The Art of Nature which includes nature farming, and the Art of Beauty which includes practices such as Ikebana, a form of Japanese flower arranging. In 1926, Okada claimed to have received a divine revelation that empowered him to be a channel of God's Healing Light (johrei) to purify the spiritual realm to remove the spiritual causes of illness, poverty, and strife from the world and inaugurate a new Messianic Age. He went on to teach Johrei to his followers to allow them to achieve Messianity and spread the teachings across the world. Members are given permission to channel Johrei by wearing an O-Hikari pendant containing a copy of one of Mokichi Okada's calligraphies. He is often referred to as "Meishu-Sama" (Lord of Light) by his followers.

Okada's teaching is represented by a number of his works, such as Foundation of Paradise and Johrei: Divine Light of Salvation, which has been edited and translated by the Society of Johrei, an offshoot of COWM.

The movement currently claims 800,000 followers, including many in Brazil. Shinji Shumeikai , also known as Shumei, also follows the teachings of Okada and is considered a descendant of the church by CFAR.

According to anthropologist of religion Winston Davis, Mahikari groups are comparable to The Church of World Messianity and follow basically the same healing ritual.

In Brazil 

Japanese Brazilians are the largest concentration of people of Japanese descent outside Japan. According to Hideaki Matsuoka of the University of California, Berkeley, in a presentation at the Summer 2000 Asian Studies Conference Japan entitled "Messianity Makes the Person Useful: Describing Differences in a Japanese Religion in Brazil," Japanese new religions have propagated in Brazil since the 1930s and now have at least a million non-Japanese Brazilian followers. Four major religions ranked by the number of followers are Seicho-no-Ie, Messianity, Mahikari and PL Kyodan.

In Brazil, Guarapiranga is the sacred place of the Church of World Messianity.

Notes

References 
 Matsuoka, Hideaki. University of California, Berkeley,  "Messianity Makes the Person Useful: Describing Differences in a Japanese Religion in Brazil", presented at the Summer 2000 Asian Studies Conference Japan.
 Wilson, Andrew, ed. (1991). World Scripture: A Comparative Anthology of Sacred Texts. New York, NY: Paragon House Publishers. Contains over 4,000 scriptural passages from 268 sacred texts and 55 oral traditions gathered by Wilson, a follower of Sun Myung Moon. The material is organized under 145 themes common to the texts and traditions. This site contains the complete text of the printed book.

External links

 Sekai Kyusei Kyo IZUNOME
 Miroku Association USA
 Izunome Association Canada
 Igreja Messianica Mundial do Brasil
 Guarapiranga Sacred Grounds - Sao Paulo, Brazil
 Shumei

New religious movements
Religious organizations based in Japan
Japanese new religions
Shinto new religious movements